Bizimungu may refer to:
 Augustin Bizimungu (b. 1952), former general of the Rwandan Armed Forces, currently serving 30 years in prison for genocide and crimes against humanity
 Pasteur Bizimungu (b. 1950), president of Rwanda from 1994 to 2000